Warrington is a large town in Cheshire, England, formerly in Lancashire. 

Warrington may also refer to:

Places

Other places in England
Warrington, Buckinghamshire, a village in South East England
Warrington (UK Parliament constituency), a former parliamentary constituency
Borough of Warrington, a district of Cheshire
The Warrington, Maida Vale, a public house in London

In New Zealand
Warrington, New Zealand, a seaside village in the City of Dunedin in the South Island

In the United States
Warrington, Florida
Warrington, Indiana
Warrington, New Jersey
Warrington Township, Bucks County, Pennsylvania
Warrington Township, York County, Pennsylvania

People

Surname
Charles Warrington (born 1971), American professional wrestler
Don Warrington (born 1951), British actor
Eirlys Warrington (born 1942), British nurse
Freda Warrington (born 1956), British writer
George Warrington (1952–2007), American transportation executive
Josh Warrington (born 1990), British professional boxer
Lewis Warrington (United States Navy officer) (1782–1851), American naval officer 
Marisa Warrington (born 1973), Australian actress
Otilio Warrington (born 1944), Puerto Rican comedian
Percy Warrington (1889–1961), British vicar and educationist
Marnie Hughes-Warrington (born 1970), Australian historian

Given name
Warrington Colescott (1921–2018), American artist 
Warrington Hudlin (born 1952), American film director
George Warrington Steevens (1869–1900), British journalist

Title
Baron Warrington of Clyffe
Baron Hoyle of Warrington
Earl of Warrington

Fictional characters
Andrew Warrington
Luke Warrington
Nikki Warrington
Sara Warrington

Other
USS Warrington, the name of several American naval ships
USLHT Warrington, was an American lighthouse tender ship
Warrington Wizards (formerly Warrington Woolston Rovers), a rugby league team
Warrington Wolves, a rugby league team
Warrington College of Business at the University of Florida
Warrington hammer, a type of hammer used by woodworkers

See also
Warington Baden-Powell, founder of Sea Scouting
Warington Wilkinson Smyth, a British geologist